Norglenwold is a summer village in central Alberta, Canada. It is located on the southeast shore of Sylvan Lake adjacent to the Town of Sylvan Lake.

Demographics 

In the 2016 Census of Population conducted by Statistics Canada, the Summer Village of Norglenwold had a population of 273 living in 112 of its 211 total private dwellings, a  change from its 2011 population of 232.

See also 
List of communities in Alberta
List of summer villages in Alberta
List of resort villages in Saskatchewan

References

External links 

1965 establishments in Alberta
Summer villages in Alberta